The Tanzanian masked weaver (Ploceus reichardi), or Tanganyika masked weaver, is a species of bird in the weaver family, Ploceidae. It is found in and around swamps in south-western Tanzania and north-eastern Zambia. The Lufira masked weaver is sometimes treated as a subspecies of this bird.

References

Tanzanian masked weaver
Birds of Southern Africa
Tanzanian masked weaver
Taxonomy articles created by Polbot